Romelia Alarcón Folgar (1900–1971) was a Guatemalan poet, journalist and suffragette. Many of her themes had to do with the environment and women's rights. She is considered one of the most notable poets from Guatemala in the 20th century.

Biography
Romelia Alarcón Barrios was born on 27 October 1900 in Cobán, Alta Verapaz Department, Guatemala to María Barrios Noriega and Salvador Alarcón.  She married Domingo Folgar Garrido and had seven children. She did not begin writing until after raising her family and all of her works bear her married surname. Through her ties with intellectuals and artists, despite a lack of formal training, she was able to create a career in journalism and as a poet becoming "one of the most important Guatemalan poets of the 20th century". In 1945, inspired by successes in suffrage by women in England, France, and United States Alarcón joined with Laura Bendfeldt, María Albertina Gálvez, Clemencia de Herrarte, Gloria Menéndez Mina, Adriana de Palarea, Graciela Quan and Magdalena Spínola to form the Comité Pro-Ciudadanía to fight for Guatemalan women's suffrage.

Alarcón Folgar worked as a journalist for radio and sometimes for newspapers, also publishing pieces in magazines. She founded the Revista Minuto and as the editor of the Revista Pan-Americana, traveled internationally. She published thirteen books during her lifetime and after her death, one of her daughters published two more books. She began publishing poems in 1938 with the book entitled Llamaradas (Blaze). In it, she speaks as an early environmentalist and the obligation to preserve nature as a means of protecting the mestizo population. Unlike later poems, known for their social commentary, the collection in Llamarades are united by the central theme of protecting the great Maya tree. Some of her early works focus on domestic topics that were not within the confines of what was expected in poetry of the day. Others discussed the struggle to create. Later works denounced women's place in society and lack of freedom and her final works lamented her invisibility and discomfort that the world around her did not comprehend her, only the things that represent her.

Alarcón Folgar died on 19 July 1971 and was buried in the General Cemetery in Guatemala City.

Works

Poems
1938 Plaquetes
1938 Llamaradas
1944 Cauce
1944 Clima verde en dimensión de angustia
1954 Isla de novilunios
1957 Viento de colores
1958 Día vegetal
1959 Vigilia blanca
1961 Claridad
1963 Poemas de la vida simple
1964 Sin brújula
1964 Plataforma de cristal
1966 Pasos sobre la yerba
1967 Casa de pájaros
1970 Tránsito terrestre'
1972 Tiempo inmóvil1976 Más allá de la voz 
1976 El Vendedor de trinosShort stories
1950 Cuentos de la Abuelita1964 Sin brújula: cuentos1968 Gusano de luz: cuentos infantiles1968 Vendedor de trinos: cuentos de misterio''

References

Bibliography

External links 
 WorldCat publications

1900 births
1971 deaths
Guatemalan women writers
20th-century Guatemalan poets
Guatemalan women poets
Guatemalan feminists
20th-century women writers
Guatemalan suffragists